Magnetic field reversal may refer to:

Geomagnetic reversal
Brunhes–Matuyama reversal, approximately 780,000 years ago
Gauss-Matuyama reversal, approximately 2.588 million years ago
Jaramillo reversal, approximately one million years ago
Laschamp event, a short reversal that occurred 41,000 years ago 
Reversal of the solar magnetic field
Magnetization reversal, a process leading to a 180° reorientation of the magnetization vector with respect to its initial direction
Polarity reversal (seismology), a local amplitude seismic anomaly

See also
Geomagnetic excursion
Polarity chron
Pole shift hypothesis
True polar wander